Zanna Bukar Suloma Dipcharima (1917 - 1969) was a Nigerian politician who was active during the Nigerian First Republic, he was a member of the House of Representatives and later appointed a Minister in the administration of Tafawa Balewa. He was a former Minister of Commerce and Industry and also of Transport.

Early life and education 
Dipcharima was born in 1917 in Dipcharima village in Borno State. He attended the Maiduguri Middle School and later trained as a teacher at the Katsina Higher Training College.

Career and politics 
Dipcharima began his career as a teacher, working at various schools from 1938 until 1946 when he embarked on a political career. He first joined the National Council of Nigeria and the Cameroons (NCNC), a party led by Dr Nnamdi Azikwe, and was in the party's delegation to Britain  in 1947. Dipcharima left the NCNC to become a manager for John Holt. He re-entered politics in 1954 as a member of the Northern People's Congress (NPC) on whose platform he was elected to the Borno Native Authority. As a very popular politician, Dipcharima rose to become president of Borno Province branch of the NPC and head of the Yerwa District in 1956, taking the traditional title of Zanna. He won a seat in the Federal House of Representatives in Lagos in 1954 and was made Parliamentary Secretary in the Ministry of Transport. He became Minister of State without Portfolio in 1957 and later Minister of Commerce and Industry. As Federal Minister of Commerce and Industry, he traveled to U.S in the fall of 1963 to seek American commercial interests in the development of manufacturing in Nigeria, a move if successful will reduce the influence of deeply entrenched British firms in the economy. While there, he informed interested firms a promise of absence of racial antagonism and a tax holiday. In 1964, Dipcharima took the portfolio of the Minister of Transport and was holding this office when the federal civilian government was overthrown in the military coup of 5 January 1966. In the aftermath of the coup, he presided over the Cabinet that handed over power to the armed forces in the absence of the abducted Prime Minister Abubakar Tafawa Balewa.

Death 
Dipcharima died in an air accident in 1969.

References

Kanuri people
Nigerian politicians
People from Borno State
1917 births
1969 deaths